Lamond Maurice Murray Sr. (born April 20, 1973) is an American former professional basketball player.

Murray was selected seventh overall by the Los Angeles Clippers in the 1994 NBA draft after a college career at the University of California at Berkeley, during which he teamed with Jason Kidd. He has played for the Clippers, the Cleveland Cavaliers, the Toronto Raptors, and the New Jersey Nets throughout his 12-year, 736-game NBA career, averaging 11.3 points per game. After one season with the Nets, he re-signed with the Clippers in October 2006 and was released several days later.

In 2002, after being traded by the Cleveland Cavaliers to the Toronto Raptors, he tore a lisfranc ligament in his right foot during a pre-season game and subsequently missed the entire 2002–03 NBA season.

In 2009, Lamond Murray joined the Bahrain Basketball Association in Bahrain. He played for Al-Muharraq Sports Club. He was inducted into the Pac-12 Basketball Hall of Honor during the 2012 Pac-12 Conference men's basketball tournament, March 10, 2012.

He is a first cousin of former NBA forward Tracy Murray.

Born in Pasadena, California, Murray graduated from John F. Kennedy High School (Fremont, California).

He is the father of professional basketball player Lamond Murray Jr.

References

External links
NBA.com: Lamond Murray Info Page

1973 births
Living people
African-American basketball players
All-American college men's basketball players
American men's basketball players
American expatriate basketball people in Canada
American expatriate basketball people in China
American expatriate sportspeople in Bahrain
Basketball players from Pasadena, California
California Golden Bears men's basketball players
Cleveland Cavaliers players
Guangdong Southern Tigers players
Los Angeles Clippers draft picks
Los Angeles Clippers players
New Jersey Nets players
Small forwards
Toronto Raptors players
21st-century African-American sportspeople
20th-century African-American sportspeople